Mastro-don Gesualdo is an Italian novel written by Giovanni Verga, published in 1889. The first English edition, Master Don Gesualdo (1893), was translated by Mary A. Craig and was published in London by J. P. Osgood, McIlvaine publishers. Giovanni Cecchetti, in the introduction to his translation of the 1979 edition, writes that it "is generally regarded as a masterpiece".

This work belongs to the Ciclo dei vinti, together with I Malavoglia, La Duchessa di Leyra, L'Onorevole Scipioni and L'uomo di lusso, works which deal with the problem of social and economical advancement. La Duchessa de Leyra remained only a draft, while the last two novels planned for the Ciclo, L'Onorevole Scipioni and L'Uomo di Lusso, were not even started.

The novel is divided into four parts, each of which is made up of several chapters.

Mastro-don Gesualdo deals with Gesualdo Motta, a man who focuses his life on his economic assets instead of personal relationships, ending up crushed by the empty life he has created. Gesualdo lives in Vizzini (Sicily) during the Italian unification.

D. H. Lawrence wrote an introduction to Mastro-don Gesualdo, published in Phoenix II. Lawrence also wrote an essay on Mastro-don Gesualdo, published in Phoenix and in Selected Literary Criticism.

References

External links 
 Original book

19th-century Italian novels
1889 novels
Novels set in Sicily